Aruvälja may refer to several places in Estonia:

Aruvälja, Ida-Viru County, village in Maidla Parish, Ida-Viru County
Aruvälja, Lääne-Viru County, village in Vinni Parish, Lääne-Viru County
Aruvälja, Pärnu County, village in Audru Parish, Pärnu County